Stata Center, officially the Ray and Maria Stata Center and sometimes referred to as Building 32, is a 430,000-square-foot (40,000 m2) academic complex designed by Pritzker Prize-winning architect Frank Gehry for the Massachusetts Institute of Technology (MIT). The building opened for initial occupancy on March 16, 2004. It is located on the site of MIT's former Building 20, which had housed the historic MIT Radiation Laboratory, at 32 Vassar Street in Cambridge, Massachusetts.

Description

In contrast to the MIT custom of referring to buildings by their numbers rather than their official names, the complex is usually referred to as "Stata" or "the Stata Center" (though the building number is still essential in identifying rooms at MIT). Above the fourth floor, the building splits into two distinct structures: the Gates Tower and the Dreyfoos Tower, often called "G Tower" and "D Tower" respectively.

The building has a number of small auditoriums and classrooms used by the Electrical Engineering and Computer Science department (EECS, Course 6), as well as other departments and on-campus groups.  Research labs and offices of the Computer Science and Artificial Intelligence Laboratory (CSAIL), the Laboratory for Information and Decision Systems (LIDS), as well as the Department of Linguistics and Philosophy (Course 24) occupy the upper floors. Academic celebrities such as Noam Chomsky, Ron Rivest, and World Wide Web Consortium founder Tim Berners-Lee also have offices in the building.

A wide main passage running the length of the building on the ground floor is called the Charles M. Vest Student Street, in honor of the former MIT president who died in December 2013. The Student Street is often used as a more-spacious substitute or extension for the Memorial Lobby located in Building 10 on the Infinite Corridor.  The monthly "Choose to Re-use" community recycling swap fest, and a weekly fresh produce market are other events regularly held in the Stata Center. One of five MIT Technology Childcare Centers (TCC) is located at the western end of the ground floor.  The Forbes Family Cafe is located at the eastern end, and serves coffee and lunch to the public during office hours.

The MIT Museum maintains some historic displays on the ground floor of the Stata Center. A few selected larger relics of past hacks (student pranks) are now on semi-permanent display, including a "fire hose" drinking fountain, a giant slide rule, and full-size replicas of a cow and a police car which had been placed atop the Great Dome (though not at the same time). In the ground floor elevator lobby of the Dreyfoos Tower are located a large time capsule box plus informational panels describing MIT's historic Building 20, which the Stata Center has replaced.

Major funding for the Stata Center was provided by Ray Stata (MIT class of 1957) and Maria Stata. Other major funders included Bill Gates, Alexander W. Dreyfoos Jr. (MIT class of 1954), Charles Thomas "E.B." Pritchard Hintze (an MIT graduate, and of JD Edwards, now Oracle Corporation), Morris Chang of TSMC. and Michael Dertouzos.

History

The Stata Center is located on the site of the former Building 20, demolished in 1998. Building 20 was erected hastily during World War II as a temporary building to house the historic Radiation Laboratory. Over the course of 55 years, its "temporary" nature allowed research groups to have more space, and to make more creative use of that space, than was possible in more respectable buildings. The building also provided permanent rooms for official Institute clubs and groups, including the Tech Model Railroad Club and the Electronic Research Society.

Professor Jerome Y. Lettvin once quipped, "You might regard it as the womb of the Institute. It is kind of messy, but by God it is procreative!"

Architectural criticism 
Robert Campbell, architecture columnist for The Boston Globe, wrote a glowing appraisal of the building on April 25, 2004. According to Campbell, "the Stata is always going to look unfinished. It also looks as if it's about to collapse. Columns tilt at scary angles. Walls teeter, swerve, and collide in random curves and angles. Materials change wherever you look: brick, mirror-surface steel, brushed aluminum, brightly colored paint, corrugated metal. Everything looks improvised, as if thrown up at the last moment. That's the point. The Stata's appearance is a metaphor for the freedom, daring, and creativity of the research that's supposed to occur inside it." Campbell stated that the cost overruns and delays in completion of the Stata Center are of no more importance than similar problems associated with the building of St Paul's Cathedral. The 2005 Kaplan/Newsweek guide How to Get into College, which lists twenty-five universities its editors consider notable in some respect, recognizes MIT as having the "hottest architecture", placing most of its emphasis on the Stata Center.

Though there are many who praise this building, and in fact from the perspective of Gehry's other work it is considered by some as one of his best, there are certainly many who are less enamored of the structure. Mathematician and architectural theorist Nikos Salingaros has harshly criticized the Stata Center:

Former Boston University president John Silber said the building "really is a disaster". Architecture critic Robert Campbell praised Gehry for "break[ing] up the monotony of a street of concrete buildings" and being "a building like no other building". The style of the building has been likened to German Expressionism of the 1920s.

Gallery

Lawsuit

On October 31, 2007, MIT sued architect Frank Gehry and the construction companies, Skanska USA Building Inc. and NER Construction Management, for "providing deficient design services and drawings" which caused leaks to spring, masonry to crack, mold to grow, drainage to back up, and falling ice and debris to block emergency exits. A Skanska spokesperson said that, prior to construction, Gehry ignored warnings from Skanska and a consulting company regarding flaws in his design of an outdoor amphitheater, and rejected a formal request from Skanska to modify the design.

In a 2007 interview, Gehry, whose firm had been paid $15 million for the project, said construction problems were inevitable in the design of complex buildings.  "These things are complicated", he said, "and they involved a lot of people, and you never quite know where they went wrong. A building goes together with seven billion pieces of connective tissue. The chances of it getting done ever without something colliding or some misstep are small". "I think the issues are fairly minor", he added. "M.I.T. is after our insurance." Gehry said that value engineering, the process by which elements of a project are eliminated to cut costs, was largely responsible for the problems. "There are things that were left out of the design", he said. "The client chose not to put certain devices on the roofs, to save money."

The lawsuit was reportedly settled in 2010 with most of the issues having been resolved.

Occupants
 Computer Science and Artificial Intelligence Laboratory (CSAIL)
 World Wide Web Consortium
 Laboratory for Information and Decision Systems (LIDS)
 Department of Linguistics and Philosophy
 Childcare center
 Fitness center
 Forbes Cafe
 MIT Library Information Intersection cube

See also 
 Marqués de Riscal Hotel, Spain

References 
Notes

Bibliography

External links 

 
 
 
 
 
 
 
 Virtual tour: 
 

Maps
 

Buildings and structures completed in 2004
Deconstructivism
Frank Gehry buildings
Massachusetts Institute of Technology buildings
Modernist architecture in Massachusetts